Lamiaspis longiripa is an extinct pteraspid heterostracan agnathan vertebrate found in marine strata of Early Devonian Nevada.

The generic name translates as "shark shield", in reference to its shark-like hydrodynamic shape.

References

Pteraspidiformes genera
Devonian fish of North America
Geology of Nevada
Fossil taxa described in 1994